Richard Michael Krivda (born January 19, 1970) is an American former baseball pitcher.
Krivda pitched 12 years in professional baseball and won a gold medal in the 2000 Olympics.

Krivda graduated from McKeesport High School in 1988. He then went on to California University of Pennsylvania. After college, he was picked in the 23rd round of the 1991 amateur draft by the Baltimore Orioles.

1991–1993: Rushing through the minors
Krivda began his professional career with the Bluefield Orioles of Bluefield, West Virginia and went 7-1 with a 1.88 ERA. He was fifth in the Appalachian League in ERA and two wins shy of the lead. He saved one game, allowed only 48 hits in 67 innings and fanned 79. In 1992, Krivda emerged as a strong prospect. He went 12-5 with a 3.03 ERA for the Kane County Cougars, striking out a batter per inning, then was 5-1 with a 2.98 ERA in 9 starts after being promoted to the Frederick Keys. He continued to whiff over a batter per inning. His 188 strikeouts and 17 wins led the Orioles minor leaguers.

Krivda continued his fast rise through the minors in 1993. He was 7-5 with a 3.08 ERA for the Bowie Baysox and 3-0 with a 1.89 ERA in 5 starts for the Rochester Red Wings. He walked 16 in 33 innings with Rochester but allowed only 20 hits. He had made it to AAA and done well there in just his second full season in the minor leagues. He was second in the Eastern League in ERA, trailing only Denny Harriger and beating out top prospects Brien Taylor and Frank Rodriguez. Krivda got the start for the American League affiliate team for the Double-A All-Star Game and allowed two runs in two innings in a 12-7 loss. Baseball America rated Krivda as having the best breaking ball in the EL.

1994–1997: Rochester and Baltimore rotation
At age 24, Krivda spent a full year at Triple-A, one of six in which he would perform in Rochester. He had a 9-10, 3.53 record and was ninth in the International League in ERA. In the 1994 Triple-A All-Star Game, he threw a scoreless inning and struck out two. Krivda was 6-5 with a 3.19 ERA for the 1995 Red Wings. He made his major league debut July 7, 1995. He was 2-2 with a 3.24 ERA after his first eight starts, but lost five in a row to finish 2-7 with a 4.54 ERA. His secondary stats were not bad and his ERA+ was 108.

Back in Rochester to begin , Krivda had a 3-1, 4.30 record when Baltimore came calling again. He went 3-5 with a 4.96 ERA in 22 games for the Orioles; the 81 innings he pitched marked a career high in the majors. His ERA+ remained respectable at 99.

In 1997, Krivda dazzled with Rochester, going 14-2 with a 3.39 ERA, walking only 34 in 146 innings. He finished fifth in the International League in ERA and led the league in both complete games (6) and shutouts (3). He had a chance to lead the league in wins as well but spent the last couple months of the year with Baltimore. He had a 4-2, 6.30 record in 10 starts for the Orioles, a significant decline from his first two cracks at the majors.

1998: Major leagues in Ohio
Krivda was claimed off waivers by the Indians from the Orioles on March 24, 1998. He was 2-0 with a 3.24 ERA in 11 outings for the Indians, but walked 16 in 25 innings. He was then traded in mid-June to the Cincinnati Reds for Eddie Priest and Christian Rojas. Krivda was only 0-2 with an 11.28 ERA for the Reds. His big-league career was over with a total record of 11-16, 5.57. His last major league game was September 8, 1998.

1999–2003: Back on the farm and Olympic Gold

He was second in the IL in ERA, trailing only Tomo Ohka. He missed time to represent the USA in the 2000 Olympics. He took the team's lone loss, a 6-1 defeat by Cuba — Krivda allowed five hits, a walk and two runs in two innings. It was his only appearance in the Olympics. The USA still won gold handily.

Post-career notes
On December 29, 2006, the city of McKeesport unveiled a monument to Krivda and to women's basketball star Swin Cash, the two Olympic athletes from McKeesport.

References

Sports Reference

1992–2004 Baseball Almanacs, Pittsburgh Post-Gazette article on McKeesport monument.
This article was imported with minor changes from Baseball-Reference.Com's Bullpen article  on February 3, 2007. The Bullpen is a wiki and its content is available under the GNU Free Documentation License.

External links

Short biography

1970 births
Living people
Major League Baseball pitchers
Baltimore Orioles players
Cleveland Indians players
Cincinnati Reds players
Somerset Patriots players
Baseball players at the 2000 Summer Olympics
Olympic gold medalists for the United States in baseball
Baseball players from Pennsylvania
Sportspeople from McKeesport, Pennsylvania
American people of Slovak descent
California Vulcans baseball players
San Angelo Colts players
Medalists at the 2000 Summer Olympics
Bowie Baysox players
Frederick Keys players
Kane County Cougars players
Memphis Redbirds players
Omaha Golden Spikes players
Rochester Red Wings players